Usulután (from the Nawat language, meaning "city of the ocelots") is a department of El Salvador in the southeast of the country (Lenca region). The capital is Usulután.

Created on June 22, 1865, it is El Salvador's largest department. It has an area of 2,130 km² and a population of over 366,000.

On October 26, 1948, the Alegria district was abolished and a new one called Santiago de Maria was created; it contains the cities of Santiago de Maria, which is the main city, as well as Alegria, Tecapan and California.

The city of Usulutan, the department's capital, was founded by the Lenca tribes but it was conquered by the Pipil tribes. Some of the best beaches in El Salvador are located in Usulutan, and others such as El Espino are now under development. For its high migration of its residents to the United States, it is known as Shulton city.

The department is home to Jiquilisco Bay and Port El Triunfo.

Bosque Nancuchiname is a forest of the Usulután Department, framing the eastern bank of the Lempa River and the town of El Zamoran on its southeastern border.

Municipalities
 Alegría
 Berlín
 California
 Concepción Batres
 El Triunfo
 Ereguayquín
 Estanzuelas
 Jiquilisco
 Jucuapa
 Jucuarán
 Mercedes Umaña
 Nueva Granada
 Ozatlán
 Puerto El Triunfo
 San Agustín
 San Buenaventura
 San Dionisio
 San Francisco Javier
 Santa Elena
 Santa María
 Santiago de María
 Tecapán
 Usulután

References
El Salvador at GeoHive

 
Departments of El Salvador
States and territories established in 1865